Joost R. Ritman (born 1941, Amsterdam) is a businessman from the Netherlands. Ritman made his fortune with his family company De Ster, selling plastic tableware to airlines. He is the founder of the library Bibliotheca Philosophica Hermetica in Amsterdam. In 1995 he received the Laurens Janszoon Costerprijs. He was knighted in the Order of the Dutch Lion in 2002.

References

External links
Short biography of Joost Ritman

1941 births
Living people
Businesspeople from Amsterdam